The 2016 season is Breiðablik's 31st season in Úrvalsdeild and their 11th consecutive season in top-flight of Icelandic Football.

Along with the Úrvalsdeild, the club will compete in the Lengjubikarinn, Borgunarbikarinn and the 2016–17 Europa League first qualifying round.

Arnar Grétarsson's will head coach Breiðablik for the second season running after leading the team to 2nd in the league and bringing home the Icelandic league cup in his first season. He will be assisted by Kristófer Sigurgeirsson.

First Team

Transfers and loans

Transfers In

Transfers Out

Loans out

Pre-season

Fótbolti.net Cup
Breiðablik took part in the 2016 Fótbolti.net Cup, a pre-season tournament. They came into the tournament as holding champions. The team played in Group 2 along with ÍBV, Stjarnan and Víkingur Ó. Breiðablik finished third in the group with one win and two losses.

Breiðablik played FH in the 5th place final. They lost the match 1–0.

Lengjubikarinn
Breiðablik were drawn in Group 2 in the 2016 Lengjubikarinn along with KA, Fylkir, Selfoss, Víkingur Ó and Fjarðabyggð. Breiðablik finished second in the group behind Fylkir and advanced through to the semi-finals.

Breiðablik lost to Valur in the quarter-finals 2–1. Guðmundur Atli scored Breiðablik's only goal in the game when he opened the scoring in the 16th minute.

Úrvalsdeild

League table

Matches

Results by matchday

Summary of results

Points breakdown
 Points at home: 6
 Points away from home: 6
 6 Points: 
 4 Points: 
 3 Points: 
 2 Points: 
 1 Point: 
 0 Points:

Borgunarbikarinn
Breiðablik came into the Icelandic Cup, Borgunarbikarinn, in the 3rd round. The team was drawn against KRÍA from Seltjarnarnes. Breiðablik won the game 3–0 after it being goalless at halftime.

Matches

Squad statistics

Goalscorers
Includes all competitive matches.

Goalkeeping
Includes all competitive matches.

Appearances
Includes all competitive matches.
Numbers in parentheses are sub appearances

Disciplinary
Includes all competitive matches.

Squad Stats
Includes all competitive matches; Úrvalsdeild, Borgunarbikar and Lengjubikar.
{| class="wikitable" style="text-align:center;"
|-
!  style="background:#007500; color:white; width:150px;"|
!  style="background:#007500; color:white; width:75px;"|Úrvalsdeild
!  style="background:#007500; color:white; width:75px;"|Borgunarbikar
!  style="background:#007500; color:white; width:75px;"|Lengjubikar
!  style="background:#007500; color:white; width:75px;"|Europa League
!  style="background:#007500; color:white; width:75px;"|Total
|-
|align=left|Games played       || 6 || 1 || 6 || 0 || 13
|-
|align=left|Games won         || 4 || 1 || 3 || 0 || 8 (61%)
|-
|align=left|Games drawn        || 0 || 0 || 1 || 0 || 1 (7%)
|-
|align=left|Games lost         || 2 || 0 || 2 || 0 || 4 (32%)
|-
|align=left|Goals scored       || 8 || 3 || 9 || 0 || 20
|-
|align=left|Goals conceded     || 6 || 0 || 9 || 0 || 15
|-
|align=left|Clean sheets       || 2 || 1 || 1 || 0 || 4
|-
|align=left|Yellow cards       || 11 || 0 || 11 || 0 || 22
|-
|align=left|Red cards         || 1 || 0 || 0 || 0 || 1

References

2016 in Icelandic football
Úrvalsdeild karla (football)
Breiðablik UBK seasons
Breiðablik UBK
Kópavogur